The 1991–92 National Hurling League was the 61st season of the National Hurling League, the top leagues for inter-county hurling teams, since its establishment in 1925. The fixtures were announced on 28 November 2006. The season began on 20 October 1991 and concluded on 10 May 1992.

Division 1

The league saw a major restructuring of the usual four divisions of eight teams. Division 1 was split into Group 1A and Group 1B with each group consisting of six teams. The top two teams in each group qualified for the knock-out stage.

Offaly came into the season as defending champions of the 1990-91 season. Galway, Down, Laois and Offaly all entered Division 1 as part of the restructuring.

On 12 May 1992, Limerick won the title after a 0-14 to 0-13 win over Tipperary in the final. It was their 10th league title overall.

Laois were relegated from Division 1 after being defeated by Dublin in a relegation play-off.

Limerick's Gary Kirby was the Division 1 top scorer with 4-38.

Division 1A table

Group stage

Division 1B table

Group stage

Knock-out stage

Play-off

Relegation play-off

Semi-final

Final

Scoring statistics

Top scorers overall

Top scorers in a single game

Division 2

Division 2 remained as a single division consisting of eight teams. The first-placed team at the end of the group stage were deemed champions and secured promotion to Division 1.

Carlow, Roscommon, Westmeath and Wicklow all entered Division 2 as part of the restructuring.

On 12 April 1992, Antrim secured the title and promotion after a 3-8 to 0-11 win over Meath in round 7 of the group stage.

Roscommon were relegated from Division 2 after being defeated by Wicklow in a relegation play-off.

Division 2 table

Relegation play-off

Division 3

Division 3 was split into Group 3A and Group 3B with each group consisting of six teams. The first-placed team in each group contested a play-off to decide promotion.

On 13 April 1992, Kildare won the title after a 0-9 to 0-7 win over Monaghan in the play-off.

Division 3A table

Division 3B table

Play-off

References

National Hurling League seasons
1991 in hurling
1992 in hurling